Llazar Treska was an Albanian politician and mayor of Tirana from 1944 through 1945.

References

Year of birth missing
Year of death missing
Mayors of Tirana